Maruganj is a village and grampanchyat of Tufanganj subdivision, Cooch Behar district of West Bengal, India on NH31. This has one higher secondary school and several primary schools. There is also has a railway station named "Maradanga Railway Station".

Villages in Cooch Behar district